The large moth subfamily Lymantriinae contains the following genera beginning with L:

References 

Lymantriinae
Lymantriid genera L